Jiro Ono may refer to:

Jiro Ono (chef) (born 1925), chef and owner of Sukiyabashi Jiro, a three-Michelin-starred restaurant 
Jiro Ono (politician) (born 1953), Japanese politician of Your Party